Crazy Dinner Party is a 2012 Chinese comedy film written by Yu Baimei and directed by Shang Jing. The film stars Fan Wei, Huang Bo,
Liu Hua, Monica Mok, Liang Guanhua, and Han Tongsheng. Crazy Dinner Party is produced jointly by China Film Group Corporation and China Vision Media Group. The film premiered in China on January 23, 2012, during the Chinese New Year.

Cast
 Fan Wei as Master Tan
 Huang Bo as Jia Ming
 Liu Hua as Businessman Feng
 Monica Mok as Monica
 Liang Guanhua as Lao Mei
 Han Tongsheng
 Liu Yajin as Cai Jinya
 Baduo as Lao Xiami
 Feng Li as Gou Gou
 Dai Lele as Xiao Hudie
 Chen Yuemo as Xiao Ke
 Zhang Yiluan as Xiao Mei
 Shen Junyi
 Liu Yiwei

Release
The film was released on January 23, 2012, in China.

References

External links
 
 
 

2012 films
2010s Mandarin-language films
Chinese comedy films
2012 comedy films